Rind may refer to:

Food
Peel (fruit), or outer covering of any vegetable
Pork rind
The outer layer of cheese
Candied rind; see Succade
Grated rind; see Zest (ingredient)

Other uses
Rind (Baloch tribe), a tribe in Pakistan
Rind (giantess), a giantess in Norse mythology
Rind, Armenia, also Rrind
Rind et al. controversy, about a study on child sexual abuse by lead author Bruce Rind
RIND - acronym for reversible ischemic neurologic deficit
Weathering rind of rocks and boulders
Millrind, a support component for millstones

People with the name
For other people with the name, see 
Abdost Rind  (c. 1984 – 2011), Pakistani reporter
Clementina Rind (ca. 1740 – 1774), American newspaper publisher
Mir Chakar Rind (1468 – 1565), Baloch chieftain

See also
Rynd (disambiguation)